Ariella Kent is the Supergirl of the 853rd century.  She is a superhero from DC Comics' Supergirl series. The character first appeared in Supergirl #1,000,000, created by Peter David and Dusty Abell.

Fictional character biography

Pre-Infinite Crisis
When Linda Danvers tried to take the place of pre-Crisis Kara Zor-El, she unknowingly won the heart of the pre-Crisis version of Superman. The two married, and had a daughter named Ariella Kent (R'E'L in Kryptonian). When Spectre came to send Linda back to the post-Crisis era, and return the pre-Crisis to its original state (and replace her with Kara), Linda agreed on the condition that Ariella would be spared. The Spectre agreed to her terms, and when all traces of Linda Danvers' existence were wiped from the pre-Crisis era, Ariella was left alone to wander the universe. Possessing incredible powers at the very tender age of 6, Ariella began to play in space, unknowingly causing massive devastation. Her ability to time-travel carried her to the 853rd century, where she saved a planet from destruction by playing with the invaders (and accidentally destroying all of their ships and weapons). She became very attached to alien refugee, Dura, who had been fleeing from her, since she had nearly destroyed his planet. She called him "Daddy" (he called her "R'E'L, the Destroyer of Worlds"), and he was able to use her affection to exert some degree of control over her, and keep the universe safe.

Later, she time-traveled to the post-Crisis era, shortly after the "Sins of Youth" storyline, and met her newest playmate, Klarion the Witch Boy (who seemed smitten with the 6-and-a half year old powerhouse). Her whereabouts are unknown, but it is assumed she is still having adventures somewhere.

Post-Infinite Crisis
According to an interview with Newsarama, following the events of Infinite Crisis, Didio stated that the Matrix Supergirl was wiped from existence. However, Geoff Johns later stated in 2006: "As for this…huh? Linda Danvers hasn't been retconned out at all". The Linda Danvers character was used in the 2008 comic Reign in Hell, but the existence of Ariella in current canon has yet to be established.

Powers and abilities
A hybrid of metahuman/Kryptonian heritage, Ariella possesses amazing powers for her young age. She has immense strength, durability, and speed, as well as the ability to fly, travel through time at will, move objects with her mind, and teleport anywhere she wishes. She ages at an extremely slow rate, can duplicate herself, and also possesses limited vision capabilities. Due to her vast level of power and young age, Ariella could be highly destructive and would not learn to hold back.

References

Supergirl
Superman characters
Comics characters introduced in 1998
DC Comics characters who can move at superhuman speeds
DC Comics characters who can teleport
DC Comics characters with superhuman senses
DC Comics characters with superhuman strength
DC Comics extraterrestrial superheroes
DC Comics female superheroes
DC Comics metahumans
DC Comics telekinetics
DC Comics hybrids
Fictional characters who can duplicate themselves
Fictional characters who can manipulate time
Fictional characters with fire or heat abilities
Fictional characters with slowed ageing
Fictional characters with superhuman durability or invulnerability
Fictional characters with X-ray vision
Fictional extraterrestrial–human hybrids in comics
Kryptonians
Characters created by Peter David
Time travelers